Il Teatro degli Orrori/Zu is a limited edition split album of the Italian bands Il Teatro degli Orrori and Zu.

More precisely the record was limited to 666 copies, consisting of a 10-inch vinyl on CD included. The album is published by the Italian label La Tempesta Dischi.

Track listing
 Fallo! - 3:27  
 Nostalgia - 8:21

References

Zu (band) albums
Il Teatro degli Orrori albums
2008 albums
Split albums